Caesium (55Cs) has 40 known isotopes, making it, along with barium and mercury, one of the elements with the most isotopes. The atomic masses of these isotopes range from 112 to 151. Only one isotope, 133Cs, is stable. The longest-lived radioisotopes are 135Cs with a half-life of 2.3 million years,  with a half-life of 30.1671 years and 134Cs with a half-life of 2.0652 years. All other isotopes have half-lives less than 2 weeks, most under an hour.

Beginning in 1945 with the commencement of nuclear testing, caesium radioisotopes were released into the atmosphere where caesium is absorbed readily into solution and is returned to the surface of the Earth as a component of radioactive fallout. Once caesium enters the ground water, it is deposited on soil surfaces and removed from the landscape primarily by particle transport. As a result, the input function of these isotopes can be estimated as a function of time.

List of isotopes 

|-
| rowspan=2|112Cs
| rowspan=2 style="text-align:right" | 55
| rowspan=2 style="text-align:right" | 57
| rowspan=2|111.95030(33)#
| rowspan=2|500(100) μs
| p
| 111Xe
| rowspan=2|1+#
| rowspan=2|
| rowspan=2|
|-
| α
| 108I
|-
| rowspan=2|113Cs
| rowspan=2 style="text-align:right" | 55
| rowspan=2 style="text-align:right" | 58
| rowspan=2|112.94449(11)
| rowspan=2|16.7(7) μs
| p (99.97%)
| 112Xe
| rowspan=2|5/2+#
| rowspan=2|
| rowspan=2|
|-
| β+ (.03%)
| 113Xe
|-
| rowspan=4|114Cs
| rowspan=4 style="text-align:right" | 55
| rowspan=4 style="text-align:right" | 59
| rowspan=4|113.94145(33)#
| rowspan=4|0.57(2) s
| β+ (91.09%)
| 114Xe
| rowspan=4|(1+)
| rowspan=4|
| rowspan=4|
|-
| β+, p (8.69%)
| 113I
|-
| β+, α (.19%)
| 110Te
|-
| α (.018%)
| 110I
|-
| rowspan=2|115Cs
| rowspan=2 style="text-align:right" | 55
| rowspan=2 style="text-align:right" | 60
| rowspan=2|114.93591(32)#
| rowspan=2|1.4(8) s
| β+ (99.93%)
| 115Xe
| rowspan=2|9/2+#
| rowspan=2|
| rowspan=2|
|-
| β+, p (.07%)
| 114I
|-
| rowspan=3|116Cs
| rowspan=3 style="text-align:right" | 55
| rowspan=3 style="text-align:right" | 61
| rowspan=3|115.93337(11)#
| rowspan=3|0.70(4) s
| β+ (99.67%)
| 116Xe
| rowspan=3|(1+)
| rowspan=3|
| rowspan=3|
|-
| β+, p (.279%)
| 115I
|-
| β+, α (.049%)
| 112Te
|-
| rowspan=3 style="text-indent:1em" | 116mCs
| rowspan=3 colspan="3" style="text-indent:2em" | 100(60)# keV
| rowspan=3|3.85(13) s
| β+ (99.48%)
| 116Xe
| rowspan=3|4+, 5, 6
| rowspan=3|
| rowspan=3|
|-
| β+, p (.51%)
| 115I
|-
| β+, α (.008%)
| 112Te
|-
| 117Cs
| style="text-align:right" | 55
| style="text-align:right" | 62
| 116.92867(7)
| 8.4(6) s
| β+
| 117Xe
| (9/2+)#
|
|
|-
| style="text-indent:1em" | 117mCs
| colspan="3" style="text-indent:2em" | 150(80)# keV
| 6.5(4) s
| β+
| 117Xe
| 3/2+#
|
|
|-
| rowspan=3|118Cs
| rowspan=3 style="text-align:right" | 55
| rowspan=3 style="text-align:right" | 63
| rowspan=3|117.926559(14)
| rowspan=3|14(2) s
| β+ (99.95%)
| 118Xe
| rowspan=3|2
| rowspan=3|
| rowspan=3|
|-
| β+, p (.042%)
| 117I
|-
| β+, α (.0024%)
| 114Te
|-
| rowspan=3 style="text-indent:1em" | 118mCs
| rowspan=3 colspan="3" style="text-indent:2em" | 100(60)# keV
| rowspan=3|17(3) s
| β+ (99.95%)
| 118Xe
| rowspan=3|(7−)
| rowspan=3|
| rowspan=3|
|-
| β+, p (.042%)
| 117I
|-
| β+, α (.0024%)
| 114Te
|-
| rowspan=2|119Cs
| rowspan=2 style="text-align:right" | 55
| rowspan=2 style="text-align:right" | 64
| rowspan=2|118.922377(15)
| rowspan=2|43.0(2) s
| β+
| 119Xe
| rowspan=2|9/2+
| rowspan=2|
| rowspan=2|
|-
| β+, α (2×10−6%)
| 115Te
|-
| style="text-indent:1em" | 119mCs
| colspan="3" style="text-indent:2em" | 50(30)# keV
| 30.4(1) s
| β+
| 119Xe
| 3/2(+)
|
|
|-
| rowspan=3|120Cs
| rowspan=3 style="text-align:right" | 55
| rowspan=3 style="text-align:right" | 65
| rowspan=3|119.920677(11)
| rowspan=3|61.2(18) s
| β+
| 120Xe
| rowspan=3|2(−#)
| rowspan=3|
| rowspan=3|
|-
| β+, α (2×10−5%)
| 116Te
|-
| β+, p (7×10−6%)
| 119I
|-
| rowspan=3 style="text-indent:1em" | 120mCs
| rowspan=3 colspan="3" style="text-indent:2em" | 100(60)# keV
| rowspan=3|57(6) s
| β+
| 120Xe
| rowspan=3|(7−)
| rowspan=3|
| rowspan=3|
|-
| β+, α (2×10−5%)
| 116Te
|-
| β+, p (7×10−6%)
| 119I
|-
| 121Cs
| style="text-align:right" | 55
| style="text-align:right" | 66
| 120.917229(15)
| 155(4) s
| β+
| 121Xe
| 3/2(+)
|
|
|-
| rowspan=2 style="text-indent:1em" | 121mCs
| rowspan=2 colspan="3" style="text-indent:2em" | 68.5(3) keV
| rowspan=2|122(3) s
| β+ (83%)
| 121Xe
| rowspan=2|9/2(+)
| rowspan=2|
| rowspan=2|
|-
| IT (17%)
| 121Cs
|-
| rowspan=2|122Cs
| rowspan=2 style="text-align:right" | 55
| rowspan=2 style="text-align:right" | 67
| rowspan=2|121.91611(3)
| rowspan=2|21.18(19) s
| β+
| 122Xe
| rowspan=2|1+
| rowspan=2|
| rowspan=2|
|-
| β+, α (2×10−7%)
| 118Te
|-
| style="text-indent:1em" | 122m1Cs
| colspan="3" style="text-indent:2em" | 45.8 keV
| >1 μs
|
|
| (3)+
|
|
|-
| style="text-indent:1em" | 122m2Cs
| colspan="3" style="text-indent:2em" | 140(30) keV
| 3.70(11) min
| β+
| 122Xe
| 8−
|
|
|-
| style="text-indent:1em" | 122m3Cs
| colspan="3" style="text-indent:2em" | 127.0(5) keV
| 360(20) ms
|
|
| (5)−
|
|
|-
| 123Cs
| style="text-align:right" | 55
| style="text-align:right" | 68
| 122.912996(13)
| 5.88(3) min
| β+
| 123Xe
| 1/2+
|
|
|-
| style="text-indent:1em" | 123m1Cs
| colspan="3" style="text-indent:2em" | 156.27(5) keV
| 1.64(12) s
| IT
| 123Cs
| (11/2)−
|
|
|-
| style="text-indent:1em" | 123m2Cs
| colspan="3" style="text-indent:2em" | 231.63+X keV
| 114(5) ns
|
|
| (9/2+)
|
|
|-
| 124Cs
| style="text-align:right" | 55
| style="text-align:right" | 69
| 123.912258(9)
| 30.9(4) s
| β+
| 124Xe
| 1+
|
|
|-
| style="text-indent:1em" | 124mCs
| colspan="3" style="text-indent:2em" | 462.55(17) keV
| 6.3(2) s
| IT
| 124Cs
| (7)+
|
|
|-
| 125Cs
| style="text-align:right" | 55
| style="text-align:right" | 70
| 124.909728(8)
| 46.7(1) min
| β+
| 125Xe
| 1/2(+)
|
|
|-
| style="text-indent:1em" | 125mCs
| colspan="3" style="text-indent:2em" | 266.6(11) keV
| 900(30) ms
|
|
| (11/2−)
|
|
|-
| 126Cs
| style="text-align:right" | 55
| style="text-align:right" | 71
| 125.909452(13)
| 1.64(2) min
| β+
| 126Xe
| 1+
|
|
|-
| style="text-indent:1em" | 126m1Cs
| colspan="3" style="text-indent:2em" | 273.0(7) keV
| >1 μs
|
|
|
|
|
|-
| style="text-indent:1em" | 126m2Cs
| colspan="3" style="text-indent:2em" | 596.1(11) keV
| 171(14) μs
|
|
|
|
|
|-
| 127Cs
| style="text-align:right" | 55
| style="text-align:right" | 72
| 126.907418(6)
| 6.25(10) h
| β+
| 127Xe
| 1/2+
|
|
|-
| style="text-indent:1em" | 127mCs
| colspan="3" style="text-indent:2em" | 452.23(21) keV
| 55(3) μs
|
|
| (11/2)−
|
|
|-
| 128Cs
| style="text-align:right" | 55
| style="text-align:right" | 73
| 127.907749(6)
| 3.640(14) min
| β+
| 128Xe
| 1+
|
|
|-
| 129Cs
| style="text-align:right" | 55
| style="text-align:right" | 74
| 128.906064(5)
| 32.06(6) h
| β+
| 129Xe
| 1/2+
|
|
|-
| rowspan=2|130Cs
| rowspan=2 style="text-align:right" | 55
| rowspan=2 style="text-align:right" | 75
| rowspan=2|129.906709(9)
| rowspan=2|29.21(4) min
| β+ (98.4%)
| 130Xe
| rowspan=2|1+
| rowspan=2|
| rowspan=2|
|-
| β− (1.6%)
| 130Ba
|-
| rowspan=2 style="text-indent:1em" | 130mCs
| rowspan=2 colspan="3" style="text-indent:2em" | 163.25(11) keV
| rowspan=2|3.46(6) min
| IT (99.83%)
| 130Cs
| rowspan=2|5−
| rowspan=2|
| rowspan=2|
|-
| β+ (.16%)
| 130Xe
|-
| 131Cs
| style="text-align:right" | 55
| style="text-align:right" | 76
| 130.905464(5)
| 9.689(16) d
| EC
| 131Xe
| 5/2+
|
|
|-
| rowspan=2|132Cs
| rowspan=2 style="text-align:right" | 55
| rowspan=2 style="text-align:right" | 77
| rowspan=2|131.9064343(20)
| rowspan=2|6.480(6) d
| β+ (98.13%)
| 132Xe
| rowspan=2|2+
| rowspan=2|
| rowspan=2|
|-
| β− (1.87%)
| 132Ba
|-
| 133Cs
| style="text-align:right" | 55
| style="text-align:right" | 78
| 132.905451933(24)
| colspan=3 align=center|Stable
| 7/2+
| 1.0000
|
|-
| rowspan=2|134Cs
| rowspan=2 style="text-align:right" | 55
| rowspan=2 style="text-align:right" | 79
| rowspan=2|133.906718475(28)
| rowspan=2|2.0652(4) y
| β−
| 134Ba
| rowspan=2|4+
| rowspan=2|
| rowspan=2|
|-
| EC (3×10−4%)
| 134Xe
|-
| style="text-indent:1em" | 134mCs
| colspan="3" style="text-indent:2em" | 138.7441(26) keV
| 2.912(2) h
| IT
| 134Cs
| 8−
|
|
|-
| 135Cs
| style="text-align:right" | 55
| style="text-align:right" | 80
| 134.9059770(11)
| 2.3 x106 y
| β−
| 135Ba
| 7/2+
|
|
|-
| style="text-indent:1em" | 135mCs
| colspan="3" style="text-indent:2em" | 1632.9(15) keV
| 53(2) min
| IT
| 135Cs
| 19/2−
|
|
|-
| 136Cs
| style="text-align:right" | 55
| style="text-align:right" | 81
| 135.9073116(20)
| 13.16(3) d
| β−
| 136Ba
| 5+
|
|
|-
| rowspan=2 style="text-indent:1em" | 136mCs
| rowspan=2 colspan="3" style="text-indent:2em" | 518(5) keV
| rowspan=2|19(2) s
| β−
| 136Ba
| rowspan=2|8−
| rowspan=2|
| rowspan=2|
|-
| IT
| 136Cs
|-
| rowspan=2|137Cs
| rowspan=2 style="text-align:right" | 55
| rowspan=2 style="text-align:right" | 82
| rowspan=2|136.9070895(5)
| rowspan=2|30.1671(13) y
| β− (95%)
| 137mBa
| rowspan=2|7/2+
| rowspan=2|
| rowspan=2|
|-
| β− (5%)
| 137Ba
|-
| 138Cs
| style="text-align:right" | 55
| style="text-align:right" | 83
| 137.911017(10)
| 33.41(18) min
| β−
| 138Ba
| 3−
|
|
|-
| rowspan=2 style="text-indent:1em" | 138mCs
| rowspan=2 colspan="3" style="text-indent:2em" | 79.9(3) keV
| rowspan=2|2.91(8) min
| IT (81%)
| 138Cs
| rowspan=2|6−
| rowspan=2|
| rowspan=2|
|-
| β− (19%)
| 138Ba
|-
| 139Cs
| style="text-align:right" | 55
| style="text-align:right" | 84
| 138.913364(3)
| 9.27(5) min
| β−
| 139Ba
| 7/2+
|
|
|-
| 140Cs
| style="text-align:right" | 55
| style="text-align:right" | 85
| 139.917282(9)
| 63.7(3) s
| β−
| 140Ba
| 1−
|
|
|-
| rowspan=2|141Cs
| rowspan=2 style="text-align:right" | 55
| rowspan=2 style="text-align:right" | 86
| rowspan=2|140.920046(11)
| rowspan=2|24.84(16) s
| β− (99.96%)
| 141Ba
| rowspan=2|7/2+
| rowspan=2|
| rowspan=2|
|-
| β−, n (.0349%)
| 140Ba
|-
| rowspan=2|142Cs
| rowspan=2 style="text-align:right" | 55
| rowspan=2 style="text-align:right" | 87
| rowspan=2|141.924299(11)
| rowspan=2|1.689(11) s
| β− (99.9%)
| 142Ba
| rowspan=2|0−
| rowspan=2|
| rowspan=2|
|-
| β−, n (.091%)
| 141Ba
|-
| rowspan=2|143Cs
| rowspan=2 style="text-align:right" | 55
| rowspan=2 style="text-align:right" | 88
| rowspan=2|142.927352(25)
| rowspan=2|1.791(7) s
| β− (98.38%)
| 143Ba
| rowspan=2|3/2+
| rowspan=2|
| rowspan=2|
|-
| β−, n (1.62%)
| 142Ba
|-
| rowspan=2|144Cs
| rowspan=2 style="text-align:right" | 55
| rowspan=2 style="text-align:right" | 89
| rowspan=2|143.932077(28)
| rowspan=2|994(4) ms
| β− (96.8%)
| 144Ba
| rowspan=2|1(−#)
| rowspan=2|
| rowspan=2|
|-
| β−, n (3.2%)
| 143Ba
|-
| rowspan=2 style="text-indent:1em" | 144mCs
| rowspan=2 colspan="3" style="text-indent:2em" | 300(200)# keV
| rowspan=2|<1 s
| β−
| 144Ba
| rowspan=2|(>3)
| rowspan=2|
| rowspan=2|
|-
| IT
| 144Cs
|-
| rowspan=2|145Cs
| rowspan=2 style="text-align:right" | 55
| rowspan=2 style="text-align:right" | 90
| rowspan=2|144.935526(12)
| rowspan=2|582(6) ms
| β− (85.7%)
| 145Ba
| rowspan=2|3/2+
| rowspan=2|
| rowspan=2|
|-
| β−, n (14.3%)
| 144Ba
|-
| rowspan=2|146Cs
| rowspan=2 style="text-align:right" | 55
| rowspan=2 style="text-align:right" | 91
| rowspan=2|145.94029(8)
| rowspan=2|0.321(2) s
| β− (85.8%)
| 146Ba
| rowspan=2|1−
| rowspan=2|
| rowspan=2|
|-
| β−, n (14.2%)
| 145Ba
|-
| rowspan=2|147Cs
| rowspan=2 style="text-align:right" | 55
| rowspan=2 style="text-align:right" | 92
| rowspan=2|146.94416(6)
| rowspan=2|0.235(3) s
| β− (71.5%)
| 147Ba
| rowspan=2|(3/2+)
| rowspan=2|
| rowspan=2|
|-
| β−, n (28.49%)
| 146Ba
|-
| rowspan=2|148Cs
| rowspan=2 style="text-align:right" | 55
| rowspan=2 style="text-align:right" | 93
| rowspan=2|147.94922(62)
| rowspan=2|146(6) ms
| β− (74.9%)
| 148Ba
| rowspan=2|
| rowspan=2|
| rowspan=2|
|-
| β−, n (25.1%)
| 147Ba
|-
| rowspan=2|149Cs
| rowspan=2 style="text-align:right" | 55
| rowspan=2 style="text-align:right" | 94
| rowspan=2|148.95293(21)#
| rowspan=2|150# ms [>50 ms]
| β−
| 149Ba
| rowspan=2|3/2+#
| rowspan=2|
| rowspan=2|
|-
| β−, n
| 148Ba
|-
| rowspan=2|150Cs
| rowspan=2 style="text-align:right" | 55
| rowspan=2 style="text-align:right" | 95
| rowspan=2|149.95817(32)#
| rowspan=2|100# ms [>50 ms]
| β−
| 150Ba
| rowspan=2|
| rowspan=2|
| rowspan=2|
|-
| β−, n
| 149Ba
|-
| rowspan=2|151Cs
| rowspan=2 style="text-align:right" | 55
| rowspan=2 style="text-align:right" | 96
| rowspan=2|150.96219(54)#
| rowspan=2|60# ms [>50 ms]
| β−
| 151Ba
| rowspan=2|3/2+#
| rowspan=2|
| rowspan=2|
|-
| β−, n
| 150Ba

Caesium-131
Caesium-131, introduced in 2004 for brachytherapy by Isoray, has a half-life of 9.7 days and 30.4 keV energy.

Caesium-133
Caesium-133 is the only stable isotope of caesium. The SI base unit of time, the second, is defined by a specific caesium-133 transition. Since 1967, the official definition of a second is:

Caesium-134
Caesium-134 has a half-life of 2.0652 years. It is produced both directly (at a very small yield because 134Xe is stable) as a fission product and via neutron capture from nonradioactive 133Cs (neutron capture cross section 29 barns), which is a common fission product. Caesium-134 is not produced via beta decay of other fission product nuclides of mass 134 since beta decay stops at stable 134Xe. It is also not produced by nuclear weapons because 133Cs is created by beta decay of original fission products only long after the nuclear explosion is over.

The combined yield of 133Cs and 134Cs is given as 6.7896%. The proportion between the two will change with continued neutron irradiation. 134Cs also captures neutrons with a cross section of 140 barns, becoming long-lived radioactive 135Cs.

Caesium-134 undergoes beta decay (β−), producing 134Ba directly and emitting on average 2.23 gamma ray photons (mean energy 0.698 MeV).

Caesium-135

Caesium-135 is a mildly radioactive isotope of caesium with a half-life of 2.3 million years. It decays via emission of a low-energy beta particle into the stable isotope barium-135. Caesium-135 is one of the seven long-lived fission products and the only alkaline one. In most types of nuclear reprocessing, it stays with the medium-lived fission products (including  which can only be separated from Cs-135 via isotope separation) rather than with other long-lived fission products. The low decay energy, lack of gamma radiation, and long half-life of 135Cs make this isotope much less hazardous than 137Cs or 134Cs.

Its precursor 135Xe has a high fission product yield (e.g. 6.3333% for 235U and thermal neutrons) but also has the highest known thermal neutron capture cross section of any nuclide. Little or no  will be destroyed by neutron capture after a reactor shutdown, or in a molten salt reactor that continuously removes xenon from its fuel, a fast neutron reactor, or a nuclear weapon. The xenon pit is a phenomenon of excess neutron absorption through  buildup in the reactor after a reduction in power or a shutdown and is often managed by letting the  decay away to a level at which neutron flux can be safely controlled via control rods again.

A nuclear reactor will also produce much smaller amounts of 135Cs from the nonradioactive fission product 133Cs by successive neutron capture to 134Cs and then 135Cs.

Disposal of 135Cs by nuclear transmutation is difficult, because of the low cross section as well as because neutron irradiation of mixed-isotope fission caesium produces more 135Cs from stable 133Cs. In addition, the intense medium-term radioactivity of 137Cs makes handling of nuclear waste difficult.
ANL factsheet

Caesium-136
Caesium-136 has a half-life of 13.16 days. It is produced both directly (at a very small yield because 136Xe is beta-stable) as a fission product and via neutron capture from long-lived 135Cs (neutron capture cross section 8.702 barns), which is a common fission product. Caesium-136 is not produced via beta decay of other fission product nuclides of mass 136 since beta decay stops at almost-stable 136Xe. It is also not produced by nuclear weapons because 135Cs is created by beta decay of original fission products only long after the nuclear explosion is over.
136Cs also captures neutrons with a cross section of 13.00 barns, becoming medium-lived radioactive 137Cs.
Caesium-136 undergoes beta decay (β−), producing 136Ba directly.

Caesium-137

Caesium-137, with a half-life of 30.17 years, is one of the two principal medium-lived fission products, along with 90Sr, which are responsible for most of the radioactivity of spent nuclear fuel after several years of cooling, up to several hundred years after use. It constitutes most of the radioactivity still left from the Chernobyl accident and is a major health concern for decontaminating land near the Fukushima nuclear power plant. 137Cs beta decays to barium-137m (a short-lived nuclear isomer) then to nonradioactive barium-137, and is also a strong emitter of gamma radiation.

137Cs has a very low rate of neutron capture and cannot yet be feasibly disposed of in this way unless advances in neutron beam collimation (not otherwise achievable by magnetic fields), uniquely available only from within muon catalyzed fusion experiments (not in the other forms of Accelerator Transmutation of Nuclear Waste) enables production of neutrons at high enough intensity to offset and overcome these low capture rates; until then, therefore, 137Cs must simply be allowed to decay.

137Cs has been used as a tracer in hydrologic studies, analogous to the use of 3H.

Other isotopes of caesium
The other isotopes have half-lives from a few days to fractions of a second. 
Almost all caesium produced from nuclear fission comes from beta decay of originally more neutron-rich fission products, passing through isotopes of iodine then isotopes of xenon. Because these elements are volatile and can diffuse through nuclear fuel or air, caesium is often created far from the original site of fission.

References 

 Isotope masses from:

 Isotopic compositions and standard atomic masses from:

 Half-life, spin, and isomer data selected from the following sources.

 
Caesium